Ulu Tiram (Jawi: اولو تيرم; ; Tamil: உலு தீராம்) is a suburb in Johor Bahru, Johor, Malaysia. The town lies along Tebrau Highway, a section of Malaysia Federal Route 3, at the junction which leads to Ulu Tiram. As a major trunk road on Peninsular Malaysia's east coast, Federal Route 3 connects Ulu Tiram with major east coast towns and cities such as Mersing, Pekan, Kuantan, Kuala Terengganu and Kota Bharu. Ulu Tiram is easily accessible through the Tebrau Highway, Jalan Kota Tinggi trunk road, and the Senai–Desaru Expressway.

Ulu Tiram is located approximately 18 km from Johor Bahru to the south and 20 km from Kota Tinggi to the north.

History
Since the 1990s, the urban expansion of Johor Bahru has ended Ulu Tiram's relative isolation and it is now one of the fastest growing suburbs of the city as part of the Tebrau growth corridor. The town hosts a taxi depot which ferries people around Johor as well as to Johor Bahru. The taxi depot hosts a small shopping complex. The town is of little interest; markets and shophouses selling various provisions and accessories constitutes much of the town. The town also hosts a small housing and industrial estate.

Residential Area
 Bandar Tiram
 Taman Tiram Baru
 Felda Ulu Tebrau
 Taman Bukit Tiram
 Taman Intan
 Taman Sri Tiram
 Taman Ros
 Taman Mutiara
 Taman Nora
 Taman Maluri
 Taman Gunung Emas
 Taman Zamrud
 Taman Dato' Cheelam
 Taman Puteri Wangsa
 Taman Desa Cemerlang
 Taman Ehsan Jaya
 Taman Desa Jaya
 Taman Bestari Indah
 Taman Pelangi Indah
 Taman Bukit Jaya
 Taman Bestari Indah
 Taman Putri Park
 Taman Gaya
 Taman Berliann
 Kg Sungai Tiram
 Kg Tenang
 Taman Baiduri
 Taman Muhibbah

Education
 Crescendo International College

Shopping

Today's Mall Ulu Tiram is a 3-storey fully air-con contemporary shopping center, covering almost  land. The premises provide more than 1,000 free parking spaces, with 24 hours security, made up of 250 shop lots, and areas designated for exhibition, promotion, kiosks, booths, etc. Today's Mall also houses the first 3D cinema in Johor Bahru.

Tiram Indoor Water Park

It can entertain up to 1000 people at one time.

The Indoor water theme park which took 6 month to construct cost about RM4 million and is positioned in the ground floor of Today’s Mall, Ulu Tiram and started its operation last August.

NSK Trade City

NSK Trade City is a single level hypermarket located in the Town Centre of Ulu Tiram and is attached with the newly completed McDonald's 24-hour Drive-Thru Restaurant. A total of 1,000 free car parks are available in the NSK Trade City compound.

Memorial Park

Sanctuary Memorial Park, an upcoming privately owned memorial park is located just besides the Ulu Tiram town centre. With a journey taking only approximately 25 minutes from Johor Bahru, it is the nearest privately own memorial park from Johor Bahru. Situated on top of a hill, set in a tranquil environment, Sanctuary Memorial Park provides a serene final resting place for one's departed loved ones. Sanctuary Memorial Park caters to the diverse needs of a large section of the population. There are burial plots and urn compartments for Buddhist, Taoist, Catholics, Christians and free-thinkers. It's the only private memorial park operator in Johor that provides a dedicated burial area for Catholics and Christians to house their departed loved ones.

Transportation

The suburb houses the Ulu Tiram Bus and Taxi Terminal. It is accessible by Causeway Link route 6B from Johor Bahru Sentral railway station.

References

External links
 Trail of blood leads from remote school
 Catholic Traveller- Ulu Tiram
 Ulu Tiram: A cameo of life in Malaya at the time of 'The Emergency'

Johor Bahru
Towns and suburbs in Johor Bahru District